George Stobbart or Stobart may refer to:

George Stobbart (Broken Sword), a video game character
George Stobbart (footballer) (1921–1995), English footballer
George Kinnear Stobart, Deputy Lieutenant of Durham 1958
George Herbert Stobart, Deputy Lieutenant of Durham 1924; commandant of Harperley POW Camp 93